American Idol: Greatest Moments is the first American Idol soundtrack, with music from the first season of American Idol. It contains two cover songs from both Kelly Clarkson and Justin Guarini, the winner and runner-up of the original season, one song from the remaining eight finalists, one song by all the finalists, and Clarkson's two songs from her debut single as bonus tracks. It is the only American Idol album that endorses the winner's single. The album was released on October 1, 2002.

The album debuted at number four on the US Billboard 200 album chart for the week ending October 6, 2002 and sold 146,000 copies that first week.  It was certified gold on November 26, 2002,
and had sold a total of 643,000 units by May 31, 2006.

Track listing
 "(You Make Me Feel Like) A Natural Woman" - Kelly Clarkson
 "Respect" - Kelly Clarkson
 "For Once in My Life" - Justin Guarini
 "Get Here" - Justin Guarini
 "Piece of My Heart" - Nikki McKibbin
 "A House Is Not a Home" - Tamyra Gray
 "Lately" - R. J. Helton
 "Ain't No Sunshine" - Christina Christian
 "If You Really Love Me" - Ryan Starr
 "My Cherie Amour" - A. J. Gil
 "I'll Be" - EJay Day
 "Easy" - Jim Verraros
 "California Dreamin'" - Finalists
 "A Moment Like This" - Kelly Clarkson
 "Before Your Love" - Kelly Clarkson

References

American Idol compilation series
2002 compilation albums
2002 soundtrack albums